Wang Shumin (born 12 September 1993) is a Chinese field hockey player for the Chinese national team.

She participated at the 2018 Women's Hockey World Cup.

References

1993 births
Living people
Chinese female field hockey players